Connect FM may refer to:

 Connect Radio 97.2 & 107.4, a commercial radio station in the United Kingdom
 The branding for two Canadian ethnic radio stations owned by Akash Broadcasting Inc.:
 CJCN-FM (91.5 FM) in Surrey, British Columbia
 CKER-FM (101.7 FM) in Edmonton, Alberta